Frederick or Fred Foster may refer to:

Fred Foster (1931–2019), American record producer and songwriter
Fred Foster (basketball) (1946–1985), American basketball player
Fred Foster (American football) (1898–1968)
Frederick Foster (cricketer) (1882–1956), Jamaican cricketer
Frederick Foster (politician) (1777–?), Irish politician, MP for Bury St Edmunds
Freddie Foster (born 1995), English cricketer
Sir Frederick George Foster, 2nd Baronet (1816–1857), of the Foster baronets

See also